The Peacock Tavern is a historic tavern building at 1037 United States Route 201 in Richmond, Maine.  Built in 1807, it is one of the rural community's oldest surviving buildings, and has long been a landmark on what was once the main road between Augusta and Portland.  It was listed on the National Register of Historic Places in 1986.  It was owned by the state, forming part of Peacock Beach State Park, but has been privately owned by Christine and Christopher Faris since 1993.

Description and history
The Peacock Tavern stands on the east side of US 201 in rural Richmond, opposite the entrance to Peacock Beach State Park.  It is a two-story wood-frame structure, with a hip roof and clapboard siding.  It is seven bays wide, with a typical five-bay facade augmented by asymmetrically placed windows to the left.  The front entrance is flanked by sidelight windows and pilasters, and topped by a decorative carved entablature and dentillated cornice.  The interior contains well-preserved but simple Federal period woodwork, including wood paneling, fireplace mantels, and wainscoting. The main stair's newel post is a 20th-century reproduction.

The tavern was built in 1807, along what was historically the main road leading south from Augusta. It was built by Benjamin Shaw, but sold soon afterward to Edward Peacock, from whom it acquired its name.  The two-bay ell, which extends the building to the left and rear, was added later in the 19th century.

See also
National Register of Historic Places listings in Sagadahoc County, Maine

References

Houses on the National Register of Historic Places in Maine
National Register of Historic Places in Sagadahoc County, Maine
Commercial buildings completed in 1807
Houses in Sagadahoc County, Maine